Norman Brinkworth (born 28 February 1944) is a Pakistani hurdler. He competed in the men's 400 metres hurdles at the 1972 Summer Olympics. He won a bronze medal in the 400 metres hurdles at the 1970 Asian Games.

References

External links
 

1944 births
Living people
Athletes (track and field) at the 1972 Summer Olympics
Pakistani male hurdlers
Olympic athletes of Pakistan
Athletes (track and field) at the 1970 British Commonwealth Games
Commonwealth Games competitors for Pakistan
Asian Games medalists in athletics (track and field)
Athletes (track and field) at the 1970 Asian Games
Asian Games bronze medalists for Pakistan
Medalists at the 1970 Asian Games
Place of birth missing (living people)
20th-century Pakistani people